Jeranovo is a small settlement in the Municipality of Kamnik in the Upper Carniola region of Slovenia.

References

External links 

Jeranovo on Geopedia

Populated places in the Municipality of Kamnik